These 283 genera belong to Aphidinae, a subfamily of aphids in the family Aphididae. There are at least 3,200 described species in Aphidinae.

Aphidinae genera

 Abstrusomyzus Jensen & Stoetzel, 1999
 Acaudella Nevsky, 1929
 Acaudinum Börner, 1930
 Acuticauda Hille Ris Lambers, 1956
 Acutosiphon Basu, Ghosh & Raychaudhuri, 1970
 Acyrthosiphon Mordvilko, 1914
 Akkaia Takahashi, 1919
 Aleurosiphon Takahashi, 1966
 Allocotaphis Börner, 1950
 Alphitoaphis Hottes, 1926
 Amegosiphon 
 Ammiaphis Börner, 1952
 Amphicercidus Oestlund, 1923
 Amphorophora Buckton, 1876
 Amphorosiphon Hille Ris Lambers, 1949
 Anaulacorthum Ghosh & Raychaudhuri, 1972
 Andinaphis Mier Durante, Ortego & Nieto Nafría, 1997
 Anthracosiphon Hille Ris Lambers, 1947
 Antimacrosiphon Zhang, 1998
 Anuraphis Del Guercio, 1907
 Anuromyzus Shaposhnikov, 1959
 Aphidura Hille Ris Lambers, 1956
 Aphiduromyzus Umarov & Ibraimova, 1967
 Aphis Linnaeus, 1758
 Aphthargelia Hottes, 1958
 Artemisaphis Knowlton & Roberts, 1947
 Asiphonaphis Wilson & Davis, 1919
 Aspidaphis Gillette, 1917
 Aspidophorodon Verma, 1967
 Atarsos Gillette, 1911
 Aulacophoroides Tao, 1976
 Aulacorthum Mordvilko, 1914
 Avicennina Narzikulov, 1957
 Berberidaphis 
 Bipersona Hottes, 1926
 Blackmania Kanturski & Wieczorek, 2015
 Blanchardaphis Ortego, Nieto Nafría & Mier Durante, 1998
 Brachycaudus van der Goot, 1913
 Brachycolus Buckton, 1879
 Brachycorynella Aizenberg, 1956
 Brachymyzus Basu, 1964
 Brachysiphoniella Takahashi, 1921
 Brachyunguis Das, 1918
 Braggia Gillette & Palmer, 1929
 Brevicoryne Das, 1915
 Brevicorynella Nevsky, 1928
 Brevisiphonaphis Stekolshchikov & Qiao, 2008
 Burundiaphis Remaudière, 1985
 Cachryphora Oestlund, 1923
 Campanulaphis Kadyrbekov, 2016
 Capitophorus van der Goot, 1913
 Capraphis Mier Durante, Ortego & Nieto Nafría, 2009
 Carolinaia Wilson, 1911
 Casimira Eastop, 1966
 Catamergus Oestlund, 1923
 Cavariella Del Guercio, 1911
 Cedoaphis Oestlund, 1923
 Ceruraphis Börner, 1926
 Chaetomyzus Ghosh & Raychaudhuri, 1962
 Chaetosiphon Mordvilko, 1914
 Chaitaphis Nevsky, 1928
 Chakrabartiaphis Remaudiere, 2001
 Chitinosiphon 
 Chomaphis Mordvilko, 1928
 Chondrillobium Bozhko, 1961
 Chusiphuncula Zhang, 1998
 Clypeoaphis Soliman, 1938
 Codonopsimyzus Lee, 2002
 Coloradoa Wilson, 1910
 Corylobium Mordvilko, 1914
 Cryptaphis Hille Ris Lambers, 1947
 Cryptomyzus Oestlund, 1923
 Cryptosiphum Buckton, 1879
 Cyrtomophorodon Zhang & Qiao, 2000
 Davatchiaphis Remaudière, 1964
 Decorosiphon Börner, 1939
 Defractosiphon Börner, 1950
 Delfinoia Nieto Nafría & Mier Durante, 2017
 Delphiniobium Mordvilko, 1914
 Diatomyzus Heie, 1970
 Diuraphis Aizenberg, 1935
 Durocapillata Knowlton, 1927
 Dysaphis Börner, 1931
 Eastopiella Kadyrbekov, 2001
 Eichinaphis 
 Elatobium Mordvilko, 1914
 Eomacrosiphon Hille Ris Lambers, 1958
 Epameibaphis Oestlund, 1923
 Ephedraphis Hille Ris Lambers, 1959
 Ericaphis Börner, 1939
 Ericolophium Tao, 1963
 Eucarazzia Del Guercio, 1921
 Eumaerosiphum 
 Eumyzus Shinji, 1929
 Ferusaphis Zhang, Chen, Zhong & Li, 1999
 Flabellomicrosiphum Gillette & Palmer, 1932
 Fullawaya Essig, 1912
 Gibbomyzus Nieto Nafría, Pérez Hidalgo, Martínez-Torres & Villalobos Muller, 2013
 Glendenningia MacGillivray, 1954
 Gredinia Pashtshenko, 2000
 Gypsoaphis Oestlund, 1923
 Hallaphis Doncaster, 1956
 Hayhurstia Del Guercio, 1917
 Hillerislambersia Basu, 1968
 Holmania Szelegiewicz, 1964
 Hyadaphis Kirkaldy, 1904
 Hyalomyzus Richards, 1958
 Hyalopteroides Theobald, 1916
 Hyalopterus Koch, 1854
 Hydaphias Börner, 1930
 Hydronaphis Shinji, 1922
 Hyperomyzus Börner, 1933
 Hysteroneura Davis, 1919
 Idiopterus Davis, 1909
 Illinoia Wilson, 1910
 Impatientinum Mordvilko, 1914
 Indoidiopterus Chakrabarti, Ghosh & Raychaudhuri, 1972
 Indomasonaphis Verma, 1971
 Indomegoura Hille Ris Lambers, 1958
 Indomyzus Ghosh, Ghosh & Raychaudhuri, 1971
 Ipuka van Harten & Ilharco, 1976
 Iranaphias Remaudière & Davatchi, 1959
 Jacksonia Theobald, 1923
 Kaochiaoja Tao, 1963
 Karamicrosiphum Zhang, 1998
 Klimaszewskia Szelegiewicz, 1979
 Kugegania Eastop, 1955
 Landisaphis Knowlton & Ma, 1949
 Lehrius Gredina, 1995
 Lepidaphis Kadyrbekov, Renxin & Shao, 2002
 Linaphis Zhang, 1981
 Linosiphon Börner, 1950
 Liosomaphis Walker, 1868
 Lipamyzodes Heinze, 1960
 Lipaphis Mordvilko, 1928
 Longicaudinus Hille Ris Lambers, 1965
 Longicaudus van der Goot, 1913
 Longisiphoniella Chakrabarti, Saha & Mandal, 1988
 Loniceraphis Narzikulov, 1962
 Macchiatiella Del Guercio, 1909
 Macromyzella Ghosh, Basu & Raychaudhuri, 1977
 Macromyzus Takahashi, 1960
 Macrosiphoniella Del Guercio, 1911
 Macrotrichaphis Miyazaki, 1971
 Mastopoda Oestlund, 1886
 Matsumuraja Schumacher, 1921
 Megoura Buckton, 1876
 Megourella Hille Ris Lambers, 1949
 Megourina Hille Ris Lambers, 1974
 Meguroleucon Miyazaki, 1971
 Melanaphis van der Goot, 1917
 Metopeuraphis Narzikulov & Smailova, 1975
 Metopeurum Mordvilko, 1914
 Metopolophium Mordvilko, 1914
 Micraphis Takahashi, 1931
 Microlophium Mordvilko, 1914
 Micromyzella Eastop, 1955
 Micromyzodium David, 1959
 Micromyzus van der Goot, 1917
 Microparsus Patch, 1909
 Microsiphoniella Hille Ris Lambers, 1947
 Microsiphum Cholodkovsky, 1902
 Misturaphis Robinson, 1967
 Miyazakia Stekolshchikov, 2014
 Mordvilkoiella Shaposhnikov, 1964
 Muscaphis Börner, 1933
 Myzaphis van der Goot, 1913
 Myzodium Börner, 1950
 Myzosiphum Tao, 1964
 Myzotoxoptera Theobald, 1927
 Myzus Passerini, 1860
 Nasonovia Mordvilko, 1914
 Nearctaphis Shaposhnikov, 1950
 Neoamphorophora Mason, 1924
 Neomariaella Szwedo & Osiadacz, 2010
 Neomyzus van der Goot, 1915
 Neopterocomma Hille Ris Lambers, 1935
 Neorhopalomyzus Tao, 1963
 Neosappaphis Hille Ris Lambers, 1959
 Neotoxoptera Theobald, 1915
 Nevadaphis Drews, 1941
 Nietonafriella Ortego, 1998
 Nigritergaphis Zhang, Lou & Qiao, 2013
 Nippodysaphis Hille Ris Lambers, 1965
 Nudisiphon Chakrabarti & Bhattacharya, 1982
 Obtusicauda Soliman, 1927
 Oedisiphum van der Goot, 1917
 Ossiannilssonia Hille Ris Lambers, 1952
 Ovatomyzus Hille Ris Lambers, 1947
 Ovatus van der Goot, 1913
 Paczoskia Mordvilko, 1914
 Paducia Hottes & Frison, 1931
 Papulaphis Robinson, 1966
 Paradoxaphis Sunde, 1988
 Paramyzus Börner, 1933
 Paraphorodon Tseng & Tao, 1938
 Pehuenchaphis Mier Durante, Nieto Nafría & Ortego, 2003
 Pentalonia Coquerel, 1859
 Pentamyzus Hille Ris Lambers, 1966
 Phorodon Passerini, 1860
 Pleotrichophorus Börner, 1930
 Plocamaphis Oestlund, 1923
 Polytrichaphis Miyazaki, 1971
 Protaphis Börner, 1952
 Pseudacaudella Börner, 1950
 Pseudamphorophora Heie, 1967
 Pseudaphis Hille Ris Lambers, 1954
 Pseudasiphonaphis Robinson, 1965
 Pseudobrevicoryne Heinze, 1960
 Pseudocercidis Richards, 1961
 Pseudoepameibaphis Gillette & Palmer, 1932
 Pseudomegoura Shinji, 1929
 Pseudotoxoptera Zhang & Qiao, 1999
 Pterocomma Buckton, 1879
 Raychaudhuriaphis 
 Rhinariaphis Kanturski & Stekolshchikov, 2018
 Rhodobium Hille Ris Lambers, 1947
 Rhododendraphis Barjadze & Özdemir, 2014
 Rhopalomyzus Mordvilko, 1921
 Rhopalosiphoninus Baker, 1920
 Rhopalosiphum Koch, 1854
 Richardsaphis Kanturski & Barjadze, 2018
 Roepkea Hille Ris Lambers, 1935
 Rostratusaphis Fang & Qiao, 2009
 Ryoichitakahashia Hille Ris Lambers, 1965
 Sanbornia Baker, 1920
 Sappaphis Matsumura, 1918
 Schizaphis Börner, 1931
 Scleromyzus Basu, Ghosh & Raychaudhuri, 1976
 Semiaphis van der Goot, 1913
 Seneciobium Remaudière, 1954
 Shinjia Takahashi, 1938
 Sinomegoura Takahashi, 1960
 Siphonatrophia Swain, 1918
 Sitobion Mordvilko, 1914
 Smiela Mordvilko, 1948
 Sorbaphis Shaposhnikov, 1950
 Spatulophorus F.P.Muller, 1958
 Spinaphis 
 Staegeriella Hille Ris Lambers, 1947
 Staticobium Mordvilko, 1914
 Stellariopsis Szelegiewicz, 1969
 Subacyrthosiphon Hille Ris Lambers, 1947
 Subovatomyzus Basu, 1964
 Swirskiaphis Hille Ris Lambers, 1966
 Taiwanomyzus Tao, 1963
 Tauricaphis 
 Tenuilongiaphis Zhang, 1994
 Thalictrophorus Zhang & Qiao, 2000
 Titanosiphon Nevsky, 1928
 Toxopterina Börner, 1940
 Tricaudatus Narzikulov, 1957
 Trichosiphonaphis Takahashi, 1922
 Tshernovaia Holman & Szelegiewicz, 1964
 Tubaphis Hille Ris Lambers, 1947
 Tuberoaphis Tseng & Tao, 1938
 Tuberocephalus Shinji, 1929
 Tumoranuraphis Zhang, Chen, Zhong & Li, 1999
 Turanoleucon Kadyrbekov, 2002
 Ucrimyzus Mier Durante & Pérez Hidalgo, 2013
 Uhlmannia Börner, 1952
 Uroleucon Mordvilko, 1914
 Utamphorophora Knowlton, 1946
 Vesiculaphis Del Guercio, 1911
 Viburnaphis Pashtshenko, 1988
 Vietaphis Su, Jiang & Qiao, 2014
 Volutaphis Börner, 1939
 Wahlgreniella Hille Ris Lambers, 1949
 Xenosiphonaphis Takahashi, 1961
 Xerobion Nevsky, 1928
 Zinia Shaposhnikov, 1950
 † Anthemidaphis Tashev, 1967
 † Aphidocallis Kononova, 1977
 † Halajaphis Wegierek, 1996
 † Helosiphon Leclant, 1969
 † Himalayaphis Ghosh & Verma, 1973
 † Huaxiaphis Hong, 2002
 † Indiaphis Basu, 1969
 † Liaoaphis Hong, 2002
  Macrosiphum Passerini, 1860
 † Myzakkaia Basu, 1969
 † Nigrosiphum Heie, 2002
 † Szelegiewicziella Holman, 1974

References

Lists of insect genera